P. R. Thakur Government College, established in 2013, is a degree college in Thakurnagar, West Bengal, India. It offers only undergraduate honours courses in arts and sciences. It is currently affiliated to West Bengal State University.  The college was named after P R Thakur, an honorable figure in Thakur community.

Departments
 Science
Computer Science
Mathematics
Physics
Chemistry

 Arts
Bengali
English 
History
Philosophy
Political Science
Sanskrit
Sociology

Accreditation
P. R. Thakur Govt College is recognized by the University Grants Commission (UGC) and it is affiliated to West Bengal State University.

See also
Education in India
List of colleges in West Bengal
Education in West Bengal

References

External links
 

Educational institutions established in 2013
Colleges affiliated to West Bengal State University
Universities and colleges in North 24 Parganas district
2013 establishments in West Bengal